Geladaindong Peak (also spelled Geladandong,  Geladaintong or Kolha Dardong) is a snow-covered mountain (or massif) located in Southwestern Qinghai Province of China near the border of Tibet Autonomous Region. The traditional source of the Yangtze River, begins with glaciers on its surface.

The mountain's name is Geladaindong in the Tibetan language. The name in Chinese is 各拉丹冬 (Pinyin: Gèlādāndōng) or 各拉丹冬峰 (Pinyin: Gèlādāndōng Fēng, literally "Geladandong Peak").

Location
Geladaindong is located in the administrative unit known as Tanggula Town: an exclave of Haixi Prefecture, in the middle section of Tanggula Shan (the Tanggula Mountain Range).

The Geladaindong Peak is encircled by over twenty high peaks exceeding  in height. This area is directly across the border from Amdo County, Nagqu Prefecture, Tibet Autonomous Region.

Climate
Due to the area's arid climate, its annual precipitation is only . Thus, snow and hailstones frequently fall, presenting conditions for the development of glaciers.

Wildlife
The mountain serves as a shelter for more than twenty kinds of wild animals, including the white-lipped deer, Asiatic wild ass, snow leopard, and alpine snowcock.

Climbing
Geladaindong was first climbed by Japanese team in 1985 after three years of trying to obtain a permit. They ascended the peak via the northwest ridge approaching from the northeast.

In 1997 an American team climbed a new route up the northeast face (55–60°). The team consisted of William N. Rom M.D., Dan Luchtel PhD, and Mark Newcomb.  Mark Newcomb also pioneered a face solo route on the same expedition.

Although a dangerous peak to climb, Geladaindong is popular among Chinese mountain climbers. In 1994, the Mountaineering Association of Peking University (MAPKU) became the first Chinese climbing team to reach the summit of Geladaindong.

References

External links
Geladandong page 
Peking University mountaineering team's 1994 Geladaindong Climbing Photos page

Mountains of Qinghai